Robert Hurt may refer to:

Robert Hurt (politician) (born 1969), U.S. Representative for Virginia
Robert Hurt (astronomer), American astronomer

See also
Rob Hurtt (born 1944), American politician